St Euphemia is a glue on tempera painting of Euphemia by Andrea Mantegna, now in the Museo nazionale di Capodimonte in Naples. It is signed and dated 1454 on a small cartouche at the bottom, inscribed "OPVS ANDREAE MANTEGNAE / MCCCCLIIII".

Bibliography
 Tatjana Pauli, Mantegna, serie Art Book, Leonardo Arte, Milano 2001. 

Paintings by Andrea Mantegna
1454 paintings
Paintings in the collection of the Museo di Capodimonte